Andrei Nikolayevich Samorukov (born 30 May 1970) is a Russian professional football coach and a former player. He is the goalkeepers' coach with the Under-20 squad of FC Lokomotiv Moscow.

Club career
He made his professional debut in the Soviet Second League in 1987 for SK EShVSM Moscow.

Honours
 Russian Premier League bronze: 1996.
 Russian Cup finalist: 1995.

European club competitions
With FC Rotor Volgograd.

 UEFA Cup 1994–95: 2 games.
 UEFA Cup 1995–96: 4 games.
 UEFA Intertoto Cup 1996: 8 games.

References

1970 births
Footballers from Moscow
Living people
Soviet footballers
Russian footballers
Association football goalkeepers
FC Fakel Voronezh players
FC Tekstilshchik Kamyshin players
Russian Premier League players
FC Rotor Volgograd players
FC Elista players
FC Dynamo Moscow players
FC Saturn Ramenskoye players
FC Chernomorets Novorossiysk players
FC Khimki players
FC Metallurg Lipetsk players
FC FShM Torpedo Moscow players
FC Sodovik Sterlitamak players